Stephen Farrell (born 18 June 1965) is a British former cyclist. He competed in the team time trial at the 1992 Summer Olympics.

References

External links
 

1965 births
Living people
British male cyclists
Olympic cyclists of Great Britain
Cyclists at the 1992 Summer Olympics
Sportspeople from Stoke-on-Trent
20th-century British people